Leptictida (leptos iktis "small/slender weasel") is a possibly paraphyletic extinct order of eutherian mammals. Their classification is contentious: according to cladistic studies, they may be (distantly) related to Euarchontoglires (rodents, primates and their relatives), although they are more recently regarded as the first branch to split from basal eutherians. One recent large-scale cladistic analysis of eutherian mammals favored lepictidans as close to the placental crown-clade; and several other recent analyses that included data from Cretaceous non-eutherian mammals found Leptictis to belong to the superorder Afrotheria.

The most recent phylogenetic studies recover it as actually a paraphyletic assemblage leading to Placentalia.

Description 
The leptictids are a characteristic example of the non-specialized placental mammals that took part in the late Cretaceous-Paleocene evolutionary radiation, originally bunched together in the order Insectivora. The leptictids became extinct during the Oligocene. Their archaic cranium and dentition make it difficult to determine their relationship to other groups. Leptictid postcranial anatomy has been studied from the well-preserved middle Eocene Leptictidium specimens found at Messel, Germany.

The head had a long and slender snout, probably featuring a short trunk, which may have been used for scratching the undergrowth in search of insects and worms. The mouth's archaic dentition included two or three incisors, a canine, and V-shaped cheek-teeth - four premolars and three molars.

Their forelegs were shortened, but their hind legs were elongated. While this anatomy is reminiscent of small kangaroos and jerboas, suggesting a jumping locomotion, the structure of the tarsal bones hints at a specialization for terrestrial running. Perhaps these animals were capable of both modes of locomotion; running slowly in search for food, and jumping quickly to avoid threats. Additionally, the Messel specimens feature a surprisingly long tail, unique among modern placental mammals, formed by 40 vertebrae and probably used for balance.

Classification
Order Leptictida
Family Gypsonictopidae
Genus Gypsonictops
Family Leptictidae
Genus Amphigyion
Genus Gallolestes
Genus Labes
Genus Lainodon
Genus Leptonysson
Genus Palaeictops
Genus Praolestes
Genus Wania
Subfamily Leptictinae
Genus Blacktops
Genus Ictopidium
Genus Leptictis
Genus Myrmecoboides
Genus Ongghonia
Genus Prodiacodon
Genus Protictops
Family Pseudorhyncocyonidae
Genus Diaphyodectes
Genus Leptictidium
Genus Phakodon
Genus Pseudorhyncocyon

Notes

References

Further reading

External links 
 Insectivore-like mammals: Tiny teeth and their enigmatic owners

Prehistoric eutherians

Paleocene mammals
Eocene mammals
Late Cretaceous first appearances
Oligocene extinctions